Mollestad is a village in Birkenes municipality in Agder county, Norway. The village is located on both sides of the river Tovdalselva, just south of the municipal centre of Birkeland. The Birkenes Church is located in eastern Mollestad (Østre Mollestad). The Norwegian National Road 41 runs through the village. The village of Rugsland lies to the south, Svaland lies to the west, and Tveide lies to the east.

See also 
 Mollestad Oak

References

Villages in Agder
Birkenes